Storslett is the administrative centre of Nordreisa Municipality in Troms og Finnmark county, Norway. The village is located at the southern end of the Reisafjorden along the mouth of the river Reisaelva.

Nordreisa Church and Nordreisa's upper secondary school are located in Storslett. The European route E6 highway passes through this village.

Storslett was completely destroyed during World War II in 1944 at the end of the occupation of Norway by Nazi Germany; however, the village area was completely rebuilt and has had strong growth since the war.

References

Nordreisa
Villages in Troms
Populated places of Arctic Norway